Takeshi Watanabe may refer to:

Takeshi Watanabe (bureaucrat) (1906–2010), first president of the Asian Development Bank
Takeshi Watanabe (footballer) (born 1972), a Japanese football player